Raiganj Lok Sabha constituency is one of the 543 parliamentary constituencies in India. The constituency centres on Raiganj in West Bengal. All the seven assembly segments of No. 5 Raiganj Lok Sabha constituency are in Uttar Dinajpur district.

Assembly segments 

As per order of the Delimitation Commission in respect of the delimitation of constituencies in the West Bengal, parliamentary constituency no. 5 Raiganj is composed of the following segments from 2009:

Members of Parliament

^ denotes by-elections

Election results

General election 2019

General election 2014

General election 2009

Abdul Karim Chowdhary, contesting as an Independent candidate, was a rebel Trinamool Congress Leader.

General election 2004

By-election 1972
A by-election was held in this constituency in 1972 which was necessitated by the resignation of sitting MP Siddhartha Shankar Ray and his subsequent election to the State Assembly from the Chowranghee Assembly constituency. In the by-election, Maya Ray of Congress defeated his nearest rival S.K.NIyogi of United Front Supported Independent Candidate by 143,624 votes, thus breaking the record of Siddhartha Shankar Ray who had won the seat in 2009 by 64,007 votes.

General election 1971

References

See also
 Raiganj
 List of Constituencies of the Lok Sabha

Lok Sabha constituencies in West Bengal
Politics of Uttar Dinajpur district